The Istituto per la Ricostruzione Industriale (IRI; English: "Institute for Industrial Reconstruction") was an Italian public holding company established in 1933 by the Fascist regime to rescue, restructure and finance banks and private companies that went bankrupt during the Great Depression. After the Second World War, IRI played a pivotal role in the Italian economic miracle of the 1950s and 1960s. It was dissolved in 2002.

History
In 1930, the Great Depression affected the Italian financial sector, seriously disrupting credit lines and making it difficult for companies to obtain loans. The Fascist regime led by Benito Mussolini, fearing a credit crunch with subsequent mass dismissals and a wave of social unrest, started to take over the banks' stakes in large industrial companies (such as steel, weapons and chemicals). At the same time, Mussolini tried to inject capital into failing businesses (Though restructured later). Although initially conceived as a temporary measure, IRI continued to operate throughout the period of the Fascist regime and well beyond. Although IRI was not intended to carry out real nationalizations, it became the de facto owner and operator of a large number of major banks and companies. By January 1934, the IRI reported that it controlled “48.5 percent of the share capital of Italy,” and a few months later acquired the capital of the banks themselves, prompting  Mussolini to declare on May 26, 1934 to Italy's Chamber of Deputies that “Three-fourths of Italian economy, industrial and agricultural, is in the hands of the State.” The IRI heavily succeeded in its goals as it saved failing banks and companies by restructuring and refinancing the companies and banks. By 1939 the IRI and other government agencies “controlled over four-fifths of Italy’s shipping and shipbuilding, three-quarters of its pig iron production and almost half that of steel.”  Political Historian  noted that “This level of state intervention greatly surpassed that in Nazi Germany, giving Italy a public sector second only to that of Stalin’s Russia.” In reality, the IRI's activity was actually limited on the one hand to providing assistance mostly financing, and the other it was reduced exclusively to accounting and administrative control, without much interference in drawing up technical and economic plans on a large scale.

After the war
After the war, the survival of the Institute was uncertain, as it had been created more as a temporary solution than to meet long-term goals. But it proved difficult for the state to make the large investments needed for private companies that would only yield returns in the long term. So IRI retained the structure it had under fascism. Only after 1950 was IRI's function better defined: a new thrust was instigated by Oscar Sinigaglia, who, planning to increase the production capacity of the Italian steel industry, formed an alliance with private industry. This gave IRI the new role of developing the industrial infrastructure of the country, not by means of individual investments, but by an unwritten division of labour. Examples were the development of the steel industry and the telephone network and the construction of the Autostrada del Sole, which began in 1956.

"The IRI formula"
The Italian economy grew rapidly in the 1960s, the IRI was one of the protagonists of the "Italian economic miracle". Other European countries, particularly the British Labour government, saw the "IRI formula" as a positive example of state intervention in the economy, better than the simple "nationalization" because it allowed for cooperation between public and private capital. Many companies had both kinds of capital. Many in the IRI group remained publicly traded, and corporate bonds issued by the Institute to fund their companies were heavily subscribed.

At the head of IRI were leading members of the Christian Democracy party, such as Giuseppe Petrilli, president of the Institute from 1960 to 1979. In his writings, Petrilli developed a theory that emphasized the positive effects of the "IRI formula". Across IRI, companies were used for social purposes, and the state had to bear the costs and inefficiencies generated by their investments. IRI did not always follow normal commercial practices, but invested in the interests of the community, even uneconomically and to the extent of generating "improper charges".

Critical of these welfare-oriented practices was the second President of the Italian Republic, the Liberal Luigi Einaudi, who said: "A public company, if not based on economic criteria, tends to a hospice-type of charity."
Since the objectives of the state were to develop the southern economy and to maintain full employment, the IRI had to concentrate its investments in the south and to develop jobs in their companies. Petrilli's position reflected those, already widespread in Christian Democracy, that sought a "third way" between liberalism and communism, dating from the 1943 ; IRI's mixed system of state-owned enterprises seemed to achieve this hybrid between the two polarised systems.

Investments and rescues
Others were planned but never carried out, such as the steelworks of Gioia Tauro. To avoid serious employment crises, the IRI was often called in to help private companies in trouble: examples are the bailouts of Motta and Shipbuilding Rinaldo Piaggio and the acquisition of food companies by Montedison. This gave rise to more activities and dependents for the Institute.

Governance
At its head were a board of directors and an advisory board, consisting of a Chairman and members appointed by the ruling political parties. The president of IRI was always appointed by the Christian Democrats, the vice-presidency was often provided by the Republican Party, for example Bruno Visentini for more than twenty years and then , to counterbalance the weight of the Catholics with those of big business and the laity, represented by the Republicans. The appointment of the heads of banking, financial and other major companies was decided by the presidential committee, but especially during the tenure of Petrilli, the powers were concentrated in the hands of the president and a few people close to him.

After the transformation of IRI into a limited company in 1992, the board was reduced to only three members, and the influence of Christian Democrat and other parties, in a period when many of their members were involved in the Tangentopoli investigation, was greatly reduced. In the year of privatization, the management of IRI was centralized in the hands of the Treasury.

The IRI name remained in journalistic language as a byword for those who assign public investments to companies without strong business criteria. Government agencies such as the Cassa Depositi e Prestiti (a bank) and  have been dubbed "new IRI", with some negative connotations, to indicate that their purposes and policies tend to patronage, according to critics, rather than economic criteria.

In 1980, IRI was a group of about 1,000 companies with more than 500,000 employees. For many years, it was the largest industrial company outside the United States. In 1992 it ended the year with revenues of 75,912 trillion lire, but with losses of 5,182 billion. In 1993 it was the world's seventh-largest company by revenue, with 67.5 billion dollars in sales.

Privatisation
After World War II, IRI became one of the largest state conglomerates in the world, owning many diverse businesses such as the autostrada system, the flag carrier Alitalia and many banks, steel, food, chemicals and telecom companies. It was divested and privatized during the 1980s and 1990s and eventually dissolved in 2002. The Andreatta-Van Miert agreement marked a significant acceleration of privatization, which started in 1992. Despite some opinions to the contrary, the Treasury chose not to privatize the IRI, but to sell off its operating companies; this policy was inaugurated under the first government of Giuliano Amato and was never called into question by later governments. In 1997 it reached the levels of indebtedness secured by the Andreatta-Van Miert agreement, but divestitures continued and the institute had lost any function but to sell its assets and to move towards settlement.

See also
Alitalia (Flag carrier)
Autostrade per l'Italia (highways)
Banca Commerciale Italiana (Bank of National Interest)
Banco di Roma (Bank of National Interest)
Credito Italiano (Bank of National Interest)
Economy of Italy under fascism
Fincantieri (naval construction)
Leonardo-Finmeccanica (mechanics and automobiles)
RAI (Public broadcaster)
STET (telephone company owned by IRI and founded by it in 1933; merged with Telecom Italia in 1997)

References

Sources
 Vera Lutz, Italy: A Study in Economic Development, Oxford, Oxford University Press, 1962.
 Pasquale Saraceno, Il sistema delle imprese a partecipazione statale nell'esperienza italiana, Milano, Giuffrè, 1975.
 Bruno Amoroso – O.J. Olsen, Lo stato imprenditore, Bari, Laterza, 1978.
 Nico Perrone, Il dissesto programmato. Le partecipazioni statali nel sistema di consenso democristiano, Bari, Dedalo, 1992, 
 Stuart Holland (ed.) The State as Entrepreneur, New dimensions for public enterprise: the IRI state shareholding formula. 1972, The Centre for Contemporary European Studies, University of Sussex.

Formerly government-owned companies of Italy
Italian Fascism
Holding companies established in 1933
Financial services companies disestablished in 2002
Italian companies established in 1933
Conglomerate companies established in 1933
Financial services companies established in 1933
Holding companies disestablished in 2002
Italian companies disestablished in 2002